Tucker's Witch is a comedy-detective series that aired on CBS television from October 6 to November 10, 1982, and again sporadically from March 31 to June 9, 1983. It stars Tim Matheson and Catherine Hicks as a charming married couple, Rick and Amanda Tucker, who own and operate a private detective agency in Laurel Canyon in Los Angeles. Amanda possesses psychic powers that help the agency solve cases but sometimes lead the couple into trouble.

Pilot
The show's pilot was first filmed in early 1982 as The Good Witch of Laurel Canyon and starred Art Hindle and Kim Cattrall. In May 1982, CBS announced that the series had been picked up with that title and cast.

However, Cattrall's racy scene in the 1982 film Porky's reportedly caused CBS to demand her replacement. The show was retitled Tucker's Witch and the pilot was reshot with a new cast; Catherine Hicks replaced Cattrall and Tim Matheson was cast in Hindle's role (Hindle had also played a small role in Porky's). The original pilot never aired, but it is now available on the Amazon-owned IMDb TV streaming service along with the show's other episodes.

In a 1986 interview with the Toronto Star, Hindle spoke of his and Cattrall's departures from the series:

Broadcast history
Tucker's Witch aired at 10 p.m. Eastern on Wednesdays in its first run, and proved unable to compete with ABC's Dynasty and NBC's Quincy, M.E.. The show was placed on hiatus after six episodes had aired; months later, it was brought back to burn off the remaining episodes. The program was switched to Thursday for the second half of its run.

In later rebroadcasts on the USA Network, the program was retitled The Good Witch of Laurel Canyon, the series' original title.

The show was produced by Hill-Mandelker Films.

Cast
Tim Matheson as Rick Tucker
Catherine Hicks as Amanda Tucker
Bill Morey as Lt. Sean Fisk
Alfre Woodard as Marcia Fulbright
Barbara Barrie as Ellen Hobbes

Ratings

Episodes
The series pilot, in which Art Hindle and Kim Cattrall played Rick and Amanda, was never broadcast.

Ted Danson played an elevator killer in the premiere episode, which aired just one week after the premiere of Danson's Cheers. Others Tucker's Witch guest stars included Barry Corbin, Simon Oakland, Joe Penny and Noble Willingham.

Releases
The entire series, including the unaired first pilot, is available on the Amazon-owned IMDb TV streaming service.

References

External links
 

1980s American drama television series
1982 American television series debuts
1983 American television series endings
CBS original programming
Television shows set in Los Angeles
Laurel Canyon, Los Angeles
Television about magic
Witchcraft in television
Fictional occult and psychic detectives
Fictional paranormal investigators